Sankari Prasad Basu (21 October 1928 – 6 July 2014, also credited as Sankariprasad Basu) was an Indian scholar, writer and critic who writes mainly in the Bengali language. He is a researcher on Swami Vivekananda and his books on the subject include Sahashya Vivekananda and Bandhu Vivekananda. One of his notable publications is his seven-volume research work Vivekananda o Samakalin Bharatbarsha, for which he won the prestigious Sahitya Akademi Award in 1978.

He was born in Howrah, West Bengal, and studied at the Howrah Vivekananda Institution. He was a student and professor at Calcutta University, and retired in 1993 as the Head of the Bengali Language Department there.

Biography 
Basu was born on 21 October 1928 in Howrah, West Bengal. He was a student at the Howrah Vivekananda Institution. He received an M.A. degree from Calcutta University, and later became a professor of Bengali literature there. He was appointed the head of the department in 1985, and remained in that position until his retirement in 1993.

He has been associated with the Swami Vivekananda Archives of the Ramakrishna Mission Institute of Culture in Kolkata from its founding in 1995 to the present day, and has served as director of the Archives. He died on 6 July at the
Ramakrishna Mission Seva Pratishthan.

Literary career 
Basu had written 48 publications by 1999. Many of his printed works have been in Bengali, including biographies, essays, and criticism: Vivekananda o Samakalin Bharatbarsha (seven volumes), Sahasya Vivekananda, Nivedita Lokmata (four volumes), Samakalin Bharate Subhaschandra, Madhya Yuger kabi o Kabya, Chandidas o Bidyapati, Amader Nivedita, Krishna anad Rasasagar Vidyasagar. His English language books have included Comparative Religion and Swadeshi Movement in Bengal and Freedom Struggle of India, and he was the chief editor of the book Letters of Sister Nivedita. He has also penned books on cricket. Basu's seven-volume Vivekananda o Samakalin Bhartbarsha is considered a monumental work, for which he was honoured with Sahitya Akademi Award in 1978 by the Government of India.

Bibliography 
 Color key
 Light green indicates "Bengali language book";  pink indicates "English language book"

Awards 
Basu has received the following awards and honours in his academic and literary career:
 Sahitya Akademi Award for Bengali language in 1978
 Ananda Puraskar in 1979
 Sarat Puraskar in 1980
 Vivekananda Award in 1986
 Vivekananda Soc. Centennial Award, New York in 1994
 Vidyasagar Puraskar by Government of West Bengal in 1996

References

Citations

Works cited 
 
 

1928 births
Bengali-language writers
2014 deaths
20th-century Indian biographers
University of Calcutta alumni
Academic staff of the University of Calcutta
People from Howrah
Scholars from West Bengal
Ramakrishna Mission schools alumni